Dresden is the name of some places in the U.S. state of New York:
Dresden, Washington County, New York, a town
Dresden, Yates County, New York, a village